Trematosauridae are a family of large marine temnospondyl amphibians with many members. They first appeared during the Induan age of the Early Triassic, and existed until around the Carnian stage of the Late Triassic, although by then they were very rare. By the Middle Triassic they had become widespread throughout Laurasia and Gondwana with fossils being found in Europe, Asia, Madagascar, and Australia. A possible trematosaurid has been found in the Toutunhe Formation in the Junggar Basin. If this analysis is accurate, it renders Trematosauridae one of the longest lived lineages of Temnospondyli, having lasted as recently as the late Jurassic.

They are one of the most derived families of the Trematosauroidea superfamily in that they are the only family that have fully marine lifestyles. Long, slender snouts that are characteristic of the trematosaurids, with some members having rostrums resembling those of modern-day gavials. Traditionally, two subfamilies within Trematosauridae can be identified, the relatively short-nosed Trematosaurinae and the long-nosed Lonchorhynchinae. A third subfamily, Tertreminae, was named in 2000 and includes broad-snouted forms like Tirraturhinus. Below is a cladogram from Steyer (2002) showing the phylogenetic relationships of trematosaurids:

In 2006, a new Middle Triassic genus Trematolestes from southern Germany has been reported. It was the sister taxon of the subfamily Lonchorhynchinae and its closest relative was Tertremoides.

References

External links 
 Trematosauridae at Palaeos

Trematosaurids
Amphibian families
Early Triassic first appearances
Carnian extinctions
Triassic temnospondyls of Africa
Triassic temnospondyls of Asia
Triassic temnospondyls of Australia
Triassic temnospondyls of Europe